Robert Treat Paine (March 11, 1731 – May 11, 1814) was a lawyer, politician and Founding Father of the United States who signed the Continental Association and Declaration of Independence as a representative of Massachusetts. He served as the state's first attorney general and as an associate justice of the Massachusetts Supreme Judicial Court, the state's highest court.

Early life and ancestors

Robert Treat Paine was born in Boston, Massachusetts, British America on March 11, 1731. He was one of five children of the Rev. Thomas Paine and Eunice (Treat) Paine. His father was pastor of Franklin Road Baptist Church in Weymouth but moved his family to Boston in 1730 and subsequently became a merchant there. His mother was the daughter of Rev. Samuel Treat, whose father Maj. Robert Treat was one of the principal founders of Newark, New Jersey, and later a governor of Connecticut. Robert Treat Paine's Treat family had a long history in the British colonies and his Paine family, in particular, can trace a lineage back to the Mayflower.

Education
Paine attended the Boston Latin School and then entered Harvard College at age 14; he graduated in 1749 at age 18. He then taught school for several years, first back at  Boston Latin and later in Lunenburg, Massachusetts.  Paine also attempted a merchant career, with journeys to the Carolinas, the Azores, and Spain, as well as a whaling voyage to Greenland. He began the study of law in 1755 with his mother's cousin in Lancaster, Massachusetts.

Paine served as a chaplain in the Crown Point Expedition. Upon returning to civilian life, he did some occasional preaching and returned to his legal studies. In 1756, he returned to Boston to continue his legal preparations with Samuel Prat, and he was admitted to the bar in 1757. He first considered establishing his law practice at Portland (then part of Massachusetts but now in Maine), but instead in 1761 moved to Taunton, Massachusetts, then back to Boston in 1780.

Legal career
In 1768, he was a delegate to the provincial convention, which was called to meet in Boston. Paine, along with Samuel Quincy, conducted the prosecution of Captain Thomas Preston and his British soldiers following the Boston Massacre of March 5, 1770. John Adams was opposing counsel, and Adams' arguments won the jury's sway, and most of the troops were let off.

Paine served in the Massachusetts General Court from 1773 to 1774, in the Provincial Congress from 1774 to 1775, as well as represented Massachusetts at the Continental Congress from 1774 through 1776. In Congress, he signed the final appeal to the king (the Olive Branch Petition of 1775), and helped frame the rules of debate and acquire gunpowder for the coming war, and in 1776 was one of the signers of the Declaration of Independence.

He returned to Massachusetts at the end of December 1776 and was speaker of the Massachusetts House of Representatives in 1777, a member of the executive council in 1779, a member of the committee that drafted the state constitution in 1780. He was Massachusetts Attorney General from 1777 to 1790 and prosecuted the treason trials following Shays' Rebellion. From 1777 to 1785, his acting Attorney General was Benjamin Kent. In 1780, he was a charter member of the American Academy of Arts and Sciences. He later served as a justice of the state supreme court from 1790 to 1804 when he retired.

Death and legacy

Paine died at age 83 in 1814 and was buried in Boston's Granary Burying Ground. Many of his papers, including correspondence and legal notes, are now held by the Massachusetts Historical Society. Paine was a Congregationalist and a devout Christian. When his church, the First Church in Boston, moved into Unitarianism, Paine followed that path. A statue of Paine by Richard E. Brooks was erected at Taunton's Church Green in 1904. Paine is an honoree of the Washington, D.C. Memorial to the 56 Signers of the Declaration of Independence.

Paine married Sally Cobb, the daughter of Thomas and Lydia (née Leonard) Cobb and a sister of General David Cobb, on March 15, 1770. She was born May 15, 1744, and died June 6, 1816. They were the parents of eight children:
 Robert Paine (May 14, 1770 – July 28, 1798), died unmarried, graduate of Harvard College.
 Sally Paine (March 7, 1772 – January 26, 1823), died unmarried.
 Robert Treat Paine Jr. (December 9, 1773 – November 13, 1811), graduate of Harvard College.  
 Charles Paine (August 30, 1775 – February 15, 1810), graduate of Harvard College, married Sarah Sumner Cushing (niece of both U.S. Supreme Court associate Justice William Cushing and Massachusetts Governor Increase Sumner).
 Henry Paine (October 20, 1777 – June 8, 1814), married Olive Lyman, daughter of Theodore Lyman.
 Mary Paine (February 9, 1780 – February 27, 1842), married Rev. Elisha Clap, graduate of Harvard College. 
 Maria Antoinetta Paine (December 2, 1782 – March 26, 1842), married Deacon Samuel Greele.
 Lucretia Paine (April 30, 1785 – August 27, 1823), died unmarried.

Some of his notable descendants include:
 Charles Jackson Paine
 John Paine
 Robert Treat Paine Storer
 Robert Treat Paine, owner of The Robert Treat Paine Estate, known as Stonehurst
 Lyman Paine. He married, in 1926, Ruth Forbes of the distinguished Forbes family and a great-granddaughter of Ralph Waldo Emerson
 Sumner Paine
 Michael Paine, husband of Ruth Paine
 Robert "Bob" Treat Paine III, zoologist
 Treat Williams, Actor

References

Bibliography
 Robert Treat Paine Papers Digital Edition.
 The Papers of Robert Treat Paine, ed. Stephen T. Riley and Edward W. Hanson, vol. 1, 1746–1756, Collections of the Massachusetts Historical Society 87 (Boston: Massachusetts Historical Society, 1992).
 The Papers of Robert Treat Paine, ed. Stephen T. Riley and Edward W. Hanson, vol. 2, 1757–1774, Collections 88, (1992). 
 The Papers of Robert Treat Paine, ed. Edward W. Hanson, vol. 3, 1774–1777, Collections 89, (2005).
 The Papers of Robert Treat Paine, ed. Edward W. Hanson, vol. 4, 1778–1786, Collections 92, (2018).

External links

Biography by Rev. Charles A. Goodrich, 1856 

1731 births
1814 deaths
18th-century American lawyers
18th-century American politicians
19th-century American lawyers
American abolitionists
American Congregationalists
American people of English descent
Boston Latin School alumni
Burials at Granary Burying Ground
Congregationalist abolitionists
Continental Congressmen from Massachusetts
Fellows of the American Academy of Arts and Sciences
Harvard College alumni
Justices of the Massachusetts Supreme Judicial Court
Massachusetts Attorneys General
Massachusetts lawyers
Members of the colonial Massachusetts House of Representatives
People of colonial Massachusetts
Politicians from Taunton, Massachusetts
Signers of the Continental Association
Signers of the United States Declaration of Independence
Founding Fathers of the United States